The following is a list of medal winners at the Commonwealth Games netball tournament.

Commonwealth Games medallists

1998

2002

2006

2010

2014

2018

2022

References

Source
Results Database from the Commonwealth Games Federation

 
Netball
 
Lists of netball players
Medalists in netball